In numerical analysis, a quadrature rule is an approximation of the definite integral of a function, usually stated as a weighted sum of function values at specified points within the domain of integration. (See numerical integration for more on quadrature rules.) The modern formulation using orthogonal polynomials was developed by Carl Gustav Jacobi in 1826.

which is exact for polynomials of degree  or less. This exact rule is known as the Gauss-Legendre quadrature rule.

The Gauss-Legendre quadrature rule is not typically used for integrable functions with endpoint singularities. Instead, if the integrand can be written as

where  is well-approximated by a low-degree polynomial, then alternative nodes  and weights  will usually give more accurate quadrature rules. These are known as Gauss-Jacobi quadrature rules, i.e.,

One may also want to integrate over semi-infinite (Gauss-Laguerre quadrature) and infinite intervals (Gauss–Hermite quadrature).

It can be shown (see Press, et al., or Stoer and Bulirsch) that the quadrature nodes  are the roots of a polynomial belonging to a class of orthogonal polynomials (the class orthogonal with respect to a weighted inner-product). This is a key observation for computing Gauss quadrature nodes and weights.

Gauss–Legendre quadrature  

Some low-order quadrature rules are tabulated below (over interval , see the section below for other intervals).

Change of interval 
An integral over  must be changed into an integral over  before applying the Gaussian quadrature rule. This change of interval can be done in the following way:

with 

Applying the  point Gaussian quadrature  rule then results in the following approximation:

Example of Two-Point Gauss Quadrature Rule 

Change the limits so that one can use the weights and abscissas given in Table 1. Also, find the absolute relative true error. The true value is given as 11061.34 m.

Solution

Next, get the weighting factors and function argument values from Table 1 for the two-point rule,

Now we can use the Gauss quadrature formula

since

Given that the true value is 11061.34 m, the absolute relative true error,  is

Other forms 
That is, the problem is to calculate

Other choices lead to other integration rules. Some of these are tabulated below. Equation numbers are given for Abramowitz and Stegun (A & S).

Fundamental theorem 
Let  be a nontrivial polynomial of degree  such that

Furthermore, all these nodes  will lie in the open interval  .

To prove the first part of this claim, let  be any polynomial of degree  or less. Divide it by the orthogonal polynomial  to get

Therefore

Since the remainder  is of degree  or less, we can interpolate it exactly using  interpolation points with Lagrange polynomials , where

We have

Then its integral will equal

for all . Thus we finally have

This proves that for any polynomial  of degree  or less, its integral is given exactly by the Gaussian quadrature sum.

To prove the second part of the claim, consider the factored form of the polynomial . Any complex conjugate roots will yield a quadratic factor that is either strictly positive or strictly negative over the entire real line.

So the integral

since the weight function  is always non-negative. But  is orthogonal to all polynomials of degree  or less, so the degree of the product

must be at least .

General formula for the weights 
The weights can be expressed as

The weights  are thus given by

We can write

We can thus write the integral expression for the weights as

In the integrand, writing

yields

provided , because

So, if  is a polynomial of at most nth degree we have

Because  is a polynomial of degree , we have

where  is a polynomial of degree . Since  is orthogonal to  we have

We can then write

The integral can thus be written as

 can also be expressed in terms of the orthogonal polynomials  and now . In the 3-term recurrence relation  the term with  vanishes, so  in Eq.

Proof that the weights are positive
Consider the following polynomial of degree 

Clearly . Since  for j not equal to i, we have

Computation of Gaussian quadrature rules 
There are many algorithms for computing the nodes  and weights  of Gaussian quadrature rules. The most popular are the Golub-Welsch algorithm requiring  operations, Newton's method for solving  using the three-term recurrence for evaluation requiring  operations, and asymptotic formulas for large n requiring  operations.

Recurrence relation 

and scalar product defined

for  where  is the maximal degree which can be taken to be infinity, and where . First of all, the polynomials defined by the recurrence relation starting with  have leading coefficient one and correct degree. For  one has

Now if  are orthogonal, then also , because in

all scalar products vanish except for the first one and the one where  meets the same orthogonal polynomial. Therefore,

The recurrence relation then simplifies to

or

(with the convention ) where

The Golub-Welsch algorithm 

The zeros  of the polynomials up to degree , which are used as nodes for the Gaussian quadrature can be found by computing the eigenvalues of this tridiagonal matrix. This procedure is known as Golub–Welsch algorithm.

For computing the weights and nodes, it is preferable to consider the symmetric tridiagonal matrix  with elements

The weights can be computed from the corresponding eigenvectors: If  is a normalized eigenvector (i.e., an eigenvector with euclidean norm equal to one) associated to the eigenvalue , the corresponding weight can be computed from the first component of this eigenvector, namely:

where  is the integral of the weight function

See, for instance,  for further details.

Error estimates 
The error of a Gaussian quadrature rule can be stated as follows . For an integrand which has  continuous derivatives,

Stoer and Bulirsch remark that this error estimate is inconvenient in practice, since it may be difficult to estimate the order  derivative, and furthermore the actual error may be much less than a bound established by the derivative. Another approach is to use two Gaussian quadrature rules of different orders, and to estimate the error as the difference between the two results. For this purpose, Gauss–Kronrod quadrature rules can be useful.

Gauss–Kronrod rules 

If the interval  is subdivided, the Gauss evaluation points of the new subintervals never coincide with the previous evaluation points (except at zero for odd numbers), and thus the integrand must be evaluated at every point. Gauss–Kronrod rules are extensions of Gauss quadrature rules generated by adding  points to an -point rule in such a way that the resulting rule is of order . This allows for computing higher-order estimates while re-using the function values of a lower-order estimate. The difference between a Gauss quadrature rule and its Kronrod extension is often used as an estimate of the approximation error.

Gauss–Lobatto rules 
Also known as Lobatto quadrature , named after Dutch mathematician Rehuel Lobatto. It is similar to Gaussian quadrature with the following differences:
 The integration points include the end points of the integration interval.
 It is accurate for polynomials up to degree , where  is the number of integration points .

Lobatto quadrature of function  on interval :

here denotes the standard Legendre polynomial of m-th degree and the dash denotes the derivative.

Weights:

Remainder:

Some of the weights are:

An adaptive variant of this algorithm with 2 interior nodes is found in GNU Octave and MATLAB as quadl and integrate.

References 
 Implementing an Accurate Generalized Gaussian Quadrature Solution to Find the Elastic Field in a Homogeneous Anisotropic Media
 

 

 
 

 .

 
 
 Walter Gautschi: "A Software Repository for Gaussian Quadratures and Christoffel Functions", SIAM,  (2020).
 Teresa Laudadio, Nicola Mastronardi & Paul Van Dooren: "Computing Gaussian quadrature rules with high relative accuracy", Numerical Algorithms, vol.92(2023), pp.767–793.
Specific

External links 
 
 ALGLIB contains a collection of algorithms for numerical integration (in C# / C++ / Delphi / Visual Basic / etc.)
 GNU Scientific Library — includes C version of QUADPACK algorithms (see also GNU Scientific Library)
From Lobatto Quadrature to the Euler constant e
 Gaussian Quadrature Rule of Integration – Notes, PPT, Matlab, Mathematica, Maple, Mathcad at Holistic Numerical Methods Institute
 
 Gaussian Quadrature by Chris Maes and Anton Antonov, Wolfram Demonstrations Project.
 Tabulated weights and abscissae with Mathematica source code, high precision (16 and 256 decimal places) Legendre-Gaussian quadrature weights and abscissas, for n=2 through n=64, with Mathematica source code.
 Mathematica source code distributed under the GNU LGPL for abscissas and weights generation for arbitrary weighting functions W(x), integration domains and precisions.
 Gaussian Quadrature in Boost.Math, for arbitrary precision and approximation order
 Gauss-Kronrod Quadrature in Boost.Math
 Nodes and Weights of Gaussian quadrature

Numerical integration (quadrature)